HK 95 Panthers Považská Bystrica is a professional Slovak ice hockey club based in Považská Bystrica, Slovakia. They play in the Slovak 1. Liga, the second level of ice hockey in the country. The club was founded in 1995.

Honours

Domestic

Slovak 2. Liga
  Winners (2): 1998–99, 2000–01

References

External links
Official website

Považská Bystrica
Ice hockey clubs established in 1995